Memorial to the Revolution of 1905 in Tallinn, Estonia, is a public monument erected to commemorate the events of the Revolution of 1905. The only writing upon the monument is the date of "1905", in a similar manner to its counterpart in Riga, Latvia.

References

External links
 Lauri Vahtre, Töölisnaine, Tammsaare ja maasse imbunud veri, Postimees, 18. oktoober 2005
 Heie Treier, Linnaruumi võitmine: Estonia teatri monumendikonkurss, 12. mai 2006

Soviet military memorials and cemeteries in Estonia
1900s in Estonia
Kesklinn, Tallinn